Joffreville or Ambohitra is a town and commune in Madagascar. It belongs to the district of Antsiranana II, which is a part of Diana Region. According to 2009 commune census the population of Joffreville was 3532.

Joffreville is served by a local airport. Primary and junior level secondary education are available in town. The majority 90% of the population are farmers, while an additional 8% receives their livelihood from raising livestock. The most important crops are lychee and vegetables; also banana is an important agricultural product. Industry and services provide both employment for 1% of the population.

References and notes 

Populated places in Diana Region